Felt is an unincorporated community in Teton County, Idaho, United States. Felt no longer has a post office, but its ZIP code is 83424.

History
Felt's population was 20 in 1960.

References

Unincorporated communities in Teton County, Idaho
Unincorporated communities in Idaho